is a 3D stop-motion hybrid animated fantasy limited series created by Daisuke "Dice" Tsutsumi for Netflix. Based on "Onari's Lullaby" by Emi Tsutsumi, and inspired by various Japanese folklore, the series tells a story of Onari, who sets on a path of becoming one of the folklore heroes, protecting her peaceful village from the mysterious oni. Produced by Tonko House and animated by Megalis VFX and Dwarf Studios, the series premiered on October 21, 2022.

Synopsis 
One of the free-spirited children, Onari, had a unique power yet to be seen by her peers in a world of oddball gods and monsters of the Japanese folklore. Aspiring to be one of the mightiest heroes of her village, she decided to take a journey to discover her own power. However, when a mysterious group of "Oni" threaten her own village, reputed for being peaceful for ages, she also had to rise to the occasion to thwart their attack and protect people of her village.

Cast 
 Momona Tamada as Onari
 Craig Robinson as Naridon
 George Takei as Mr. Tengu
 Anna Akana as Ann-Brella, Ninjin
 Brittany Ishibashi as Amaten
 Archie Yates as Kappa
 Tantoo Cardinal as Principal
 Seth Carr as Calvin
 Miyuki Sawashiro as Emi
 Charlet Takahashi Chung as Darma, Tanukinta
 Yuki Matsuzaki as Tasaburo
 Robert Kondo as Nama & Hage, Kappa Papa
 Omar Miller as Putaro

Episodes

Production

Conception 
After spending several years of his career in the American animation industry, Daisuke "Dice" Tsutsumi began to wonder whether he would get a platform to tell another part of his identity. Dice then decided to start an animation project, dedicated on telling a story true to his cultural heritage. Hence, he began to conceptualize a story which were based on a Japanese mythology with a modern twist. With his project, he sought to shift the common perspective of onis and the notion of good and evil into a different angle. It was revealed later on October 20, 2022, that Tsutsumi had based the story on the poetry "Onari's Lullaby" written by his late mother, Emi Tsutsumi, who was a poet.

The environment of the series was largely inspired by Yakushima in the southern Japan, where Dice and Mari Okada often visit. Its forests, along with its vegetations, were made as the reference for the settings of Onari's neighborhood.

Development 
On March 4, 2019, Tonko House, Daisuke Tsutsumi's own animation studio, unveiled the project, dubbed as Oni , as a part of the studio's project slates among other projects such as Leo and Sleepy Pines. The project was revealed to be a CGI animated and stop-motion hybrid television series, produced (and animated) by Tonko House with its animation developed by CG studio Megalis and Japanese stop-motion animation house Dwarf Animation, with the latter responsible for a Netflix animated series, Rilakkuma and Kaoru. The animated series was revealed to be created and directed by Tsutsumi himself. The test footage of Oni was revealed on the first Tonko House Film Festival in spring 2019.

On November 21, 2019, Netflix announced its collaboration with Tonko House, with Netflix joined the production board of Oni and picked up the series to release on the streaming platform. Along with the announcement, Daisuke Tsutsumi, Robert Kondo and Kane Lee of Tonko House were revealed as executive producers of the series with Sara K. Sampson serving as the sole producer.

On June 2, 2022, the television series was officially titled as Oni: Thunder God's Tale. It would be released as limited series consisting of four episodes with Mari Okada revealed as the main writer of the series ever since 2021. CG studios, Marza and Anima were revealed to have joined the animation development.

Casting 
The casting of the limited series was revealed on June 2, 2022. Momona Tamada, Archie Yates, Craig Robinson, Tantoo Cardinal, Brittany Ishibashi, Omar Benson Miller, Anna Akana, Charlet Takahashi Chung, Miyuki Sawashiro, Yuki Matsuzaki, Seth Carr, Robert Kondo, and George Takei were revealed as part of the ensemble voice cast.

Release 
The series would set to launch globally on the streaming platform on October 21, 2022. A special screenings of the series on Animation Is Film Festival was set to premiere on October 22, 2022.

Marketing 
The first teaser trailer of Oni: Thunder God's Tale was released on June 2, 2022, along with various visuals of the series. The series were also announced at Annecy Festival 2022 as part of Netflix's "work-in-progress" lineup. On September 25, 2022, the series were showcased as part of Netflix TUDUM Japan lineup with its release date announced on official channels.

References

External links 

 
 
 

2020s American animated television series
2020s American television miniseries
2022 American television series debuts
2022 American television series endings
2022 Japanese television series debuts
2022 Japanese television series endings
Animated series based on literature
Animated television series about children
Anime-influenced Western animated television series
Annie Award winners
English-language Netflix original programming
American animated fantasy television series
Japanese animated fantasy television series
American computer-animated television series
Japanese computer-animated television series
American stop-motion animated television series
Japanese mythology in popular culture
Netflix children's programming
Television shows written by Mari Okada
Television series by Netflix Animation